The Salcha River (Lower Tanana: Sołchaget) is a  tributary of the Tanana River in the U.S. state of Alaska.

Recreation
Accessible by boat or on foot from the Richardson Highway, which crosses the lower river near the mouth, the Salcha River is a popular sports-fishing stream. The main species are king salmon, caught mostly near the mouth, and Arctic grayling, caught mostly further upstream.

Catch and release fishing for Chinook salmon averaging  can be good on this river. Summer-run chum salmon and fall-run coho salmon also frequent the Salcha, as do smaller numbers of northern pike.

The Salcha River State Recreation Site is next to the Salcha River at milepost 323.3 of the Richardson Highway. Amenities include six campsites, water, toilets, picnic sites, a boat launch, and a public-use cabin. Cross-country skiing and snowmobiling are among the possible winter activities near the site. The park is known to be crowded on holiday weekends.

See also
List of rivers of Alaska
Salcha, Alaska

References

External links
Alaska Department of Natural Resources: Salcha River State Recreation Site
 USGS National Water Information System

Rivers of Fairbanks North Star Borough, Alaska
Rivers of Alaska
Tributaries of the Yukon River
Tanana Athabaskans